Donald Joseph Plarski (November 9, 1929 – December 29, 1981) was an American professional baseball player. An outfielder, he appeared in eight games for the Kansas City Athletics of Major League Baseball during the  season. Plarski was born in Chicago.

His professional career, interrupted by military service during the Korean War, lasted from 1948–50 and 1953–56, most of it occurring in the lower and mid-minor leagues. His 1955 trial happened at mid-season. He started in three games in center field for the Athletics, including on July 21 at Municipal Stadium, when he collected his only MLB hit (off Frank Sullivan of the Boston Red Sox) and stolen base.

After his playing career, Plarski became a sportswriter and the longtime sports editor of the Alton Evening Telegraph in Alton, Illinois and was a fast-pitch softball umpire. He died at age 52 in St. Louis, Missouri.

References

External links

1929 births
1981 deaths
Baseball players from Chicago
Columbia Gems players
Enterprise Boll Weevils players
Kansas City Athletics players
Lancaster Red Roses players
Major League Baseball outfielders
People from Alton, Illinois
Pocatello Bannocks players
Savannah A's players
West Palm Beach Indians players